Dorothy A. Cadman (fl. 1908–1927) was an English painter, who predominantly worked in oil and watercolour.

Life and work 
It is likely that Dorothy was born in 1885 in Yorkshire, England. She studied painting and drawing at the prestigious Slade School of Art between 1907–1909, taking lessons from Henry Tonks. Her classmates and contemporaries at the Slade School during this period included Mark Gertler and Maxwell Gordon Lightfoot. Between 1914-1916 Dorothy exhibited six paintings at the London Salon of the Allied Artists' Association which were shown in the dramatic setting of the Royal Albert Hall. A small retrospective exhibition of her work was held at the Fairhurst Gallery, London, in October 1987. Her work is much sought after and has been sold at major art auction houses including Christie's and Sotheby's in London.

The date and place of her death is unknown.

References

English women painters
Alumni of the Slade School of Fine Art
Year of death missing
1880s births